The Women's biathlon relay competition of the Lillehammer 1994 Olympics was held at Birkebeineren Ski Stadium on February 25, 1994. Each national team consisted of four members, with each skiing 7.5 kilometres and shooting twice, once prone and once standing. The event was expanded to 4 x 7.5 km, as it had been 3 x 7.5 km in Albertville in 1992.

Results

References

Women's biathlon at the 1994 Winter Olympics
Biath
Bia